Ruch and Norie is a 2015 Latvian documentary film directed by Ināra Kolmane. The film premiered on 30 April 2015. It received four Lielais Kristaps film awards, including Best Documentary, Best Director of a Documentary and Best Screenplay.

Synopsis 

Norie Tsuruta, a Japanese anthropology student, travels to Latvia to write her Master's thesis about the Suiti community. There she meets one of the oldest Suiti women Marija Steimane nicknamed Ruch with whom Norie forms a very strong bond that does not fade even when Norie returns to Japan.

Awards and nominations

References

External links
 
 Official trailer 

2015 films
Latvian documentary films
Latvian-language films
2010s Japanese-language films